Karl Benjamin Spooner (June 23, 1931 – April 10, 1984) was an American professional baseball player. He played in Major League Baseball (MLB) as a left-handed pitcher for the Brooklyn Dodgers.

Baseball career
A native of Oriskany Falls, New York, at the age of 20, Spooner was signed to a contract by the Brooklyn Dodgers as an amateur free agent in 1951 and was assigned to play in Minor league baseball. Spooner's early minor league career was promising, but erratic. Walks were frequently a problem, as Spooner averaged a walk per inning in his first two minor league seasons. However, he also had great speed, and showed flashes of brilliance. He made his way up the Dodgers' minor league system, compiling a fairly unimpressive 27–36 record during his first three seasons. He had a breakout year in 1954 when he won 21 games with 262 strikeouts in 238 innings for the Fort Worth Cats of the Texas League. His successful performance earned him a promotion to the Brooklyn Dodgers with one week left in the 1954 season.

Spooner made his major league debut with the Dodgers on September 22, 1954 at the age of 23. He allowed only 3 hits, all singles and, struck out 15 batters, setting a Major League Baseball record for most strikeouts by a pitcher in his major league debut. He broke the record of 13 strikeouts set by the New York Giants’ Cliff Melton on April 25, . Spooner also set another record for pitching debuts by recording six consecutive strikeouts, striking out the side in both the 7th and 8th innings. Pete Richert (1962) is the only other pitcher to strike out six consecutive batters in his Major League debut. 

Four days later, Spooner beat the Pittsburgh Pirates, 1-0, striking out 12 and surrendering 4 hits. Although he only started two games for the Dodgers, Spooner, compiled two complete game shutouts, throwing 18 innings, giving up 7 total hits and no runs. His 27 strikeouts in two successive games was a National League record (not just for rookies) and was second only to Bob Feller’s 28 on the major league list.

However, during spring training prior to the 1955 season, Spooner entered a game without warming up properly. A severe arm injury was the result, after which Spooner was out of action until May 15, then made a comeback, appearing in 29 games with the Dodgers that year, but with only fairly mild success. Initially used as a spot starter, Spooner was moved to the bullpen after two poor starts. He was added back into the rotation in late June, removed from it at the end of July, and was then given some spot starts in August and September, finishing the season at 8–6. He appeared in his final major league game on October 3, 1955 when he started game 6 of the 1955 World Series.

Despite the winning record, Spooner was deemed only marginally effective. Prior to the injury, Spooner threw a fastball which ranged in the mid to high 90s; post-injury, that was not the case. In his final appearance with the Dodgers, Spooner started game 6 of the 1955 World Series, and was shellacked, giving up 5 runs in one-third of an inning, taking the loss.

Spooner never again played in the majors. Still hampered by injuries, he pitched in only 4 games in Triple-A in 1956, was later called up to the Dodgers in September, although did not get into any games that year. For the 1957 season, Spooner was demoted all the way back down to A-ball: in 13 games (9 starts) he was 2–4.

The Dodgers left Spooner unprotected in the 1957 minor league draft, and he wound up being claimed by the St. Louis Cardinals. For the 1958 season, Spooner was demoted to the very lowest rung of minor league ball, playing for Dothan in the 'D' level Alabama–Florida League, appearing in 9 games. He also played two games for Houston at the AA level that same season, but that ended his professional career. Spooner attended spring training in 1959, but retired before the season started.

Later life
As his baseball career wound down, Spooner, a native of New York state, moved to Vero Beach, Florida and found work as a manager in the citrus industry. He worked at this job for the rest of his life, raising five children with his wife Carol. Spooner died of liver cancer in 1984, aged 52.

References

External links

Karl Spooner  at The Deadball Era

People from Oneida County, New York
Baseball players from New York (state)
Major League Baseball pitchers
1931 births
1984 deaths
Brooklyn Dodgers players
Macon Dodgers players
Houston Buffaloes players
St. Paul Saints (AA) players
Dothan Cardinals players
Fort Worth Cats players
Pueblo Dodgers players
Hornell Dodgers players
Greenwood Dodgers players
Elmira Pioneers players
Miami Sun Sox players
Newport News Dodgers players
Deaths from cancer in Florida
Deaths from liver cancer